"Lost boys" is a term used for young men who have been excommunicated or pressured to leave polygamous Mormon fundamentalist groups, such as the Fundamentalist Church of Jesus Christ of Latter Day Saints (FLDS). Although sometimes officially accused of apostasy or disobedience, it is thought that they are mainly pressured to leave by older adult men to reduce competition for wives within such sects, usually when they are between the ages of 13 and 21.

Background 
Since boys and girls are born in approximately equal numbers, and women do not enter the community in large numbers, the pool of available women is not sufficient for all men to have multiple wives.

While some boys leave by their own choice, many have been banished for conduct such as watching a movie, watching television, playing football, or talking to a girl. Some boys are told not to return unless they can return with a wife.  One 2004 source estimated that more than 400 teenage boys have been ostracized from the FLDS Church for violating community rules. Another article from 2005 estimated that between 400 and 1,000 boys and young men had been pressured to leave for such reasons. Many young women also have left or been pressured to leave because they did not want to be part of polygamous marriages.

Boys in these sects are commonly raised not to trust the outside world, and that leaving their communities is a sin worse than murder. With little education or skills applicable to life outside of their community of birth, they must learn to live in a society they inherently distrust yet know little, and as a result, some lost boys become homeless or end up in the criminal justice system. They also must deal with the consequences of being shunned by their families, and believing they are beyond spiritual redemption. The families of banished boys are told that the boys are now dead to them.

Specific incidences 
The Fundamentalist Church of Jesus Christ of Latter-Day Saints (hereafter FLDS) is a particularly controversial fundamentalist sect which has repeatedly been connected with the concept of lost boys. As early as 1968, the church's home turf of Colorado City, Arizona had a peace officer whose responsibility was "to make sure that the boys would not associate with the girls.” This officer's main police duties evolved over the next two decades to include "running the surplus boys out of town" so as to allow the "worthy" men of the community to live plural marriage by adding new, younger wives. More recently, in the mid 1990s, a Colorado City police officer named Rodney Holm was one of a dozen men who attacked and assaulted a 17 year old named Robert Williams, because Williams had showed interest in a girl his age. The attack was organized by the girl's father, who was also Officer Holm’s brother. Afterwards, in February 1996, they pleaded no contest to simple assault.

Some individuals, such as Dan Fischer, a dentist who left the FLDS Church, work to help young men who have left or who have been ejected from polygamist organizations in cities like Hildale, Utah, or Colorado City, Arizona. The FLDS church was sued by six "lost boys" in August 2004 for "alleged economic and psychological injury."

Brent Jeffs details his early life as the grandson to a FLDS prophet and his eventual excommunication as "very different". At an early age Jeffs father decided to leave the church and take his family with him. Upon hearing this news Jeffs decides to return to the church to make the decision on his own. During this time he experiences a social black-balling for his families history with FLDS, as well as getting romantically intertwined with a girl his age, and removed himself once again from the church.

In popular culture
In the HBO television series Big Love (2006-2011), the main protagonist is a former lost boy, having grown up challenging the elder who drove him out of their community as a teenager. The series portrays machinations of some senior men within a fundamentalist congregation to "reserve" young unmarried women for themselves.

The documentary film Sons of Perdition (2010) depicts the struggles of three real-life lost boys.

The off-Broadway play Exit 27 (2013) dramatized the story of four lost boys struggling to survive in the desert outside Colorado City. Playwright Aleks Merilo based the script on interviews conducted with lost boys living in Hurricane, Utah.

See also
 Operational sex ratio
 Population dynamics
 YFZ Ranch
 Ex-Mormon

Notes

References
 Krakauer, Jon. Under the Banner of Heaven: A Story of Violent Faith (2003).
 Emmett, Andrea Moore. God's Brothel: The Extortion of Sex for Salvation in Contemporary Mormon and Christian Fundamentalist Polygamy and the Stories of 18 Women Who Escaped (2004).
 Bistline, Benjamin G. Colorado City Polygamists: An Inside Look for the Outsider (2004). A Colorado City historian presents the beginnings of the group and its original religious doctrine.
 Bistline, Benjamin G. The Polygamists: A History of Colorado City, Arizona (2004)
 Tracy, Kathleen. The Secret Story of Polygamy (2001). Centered on the trial of John Daniel Kingston, who was tried for assault on his 16-year-old daughter.
 Llewellyn, John R. Polygamy Under Attack: From Tom Green to Brian David Mitchell (2004)

 Main Street Church.  Lifting the Veil of Polygamy (2007).  A documentary film on the history and modern-day expressions of Mormon polygamy, including numerous testimonials.
 Jeffs, Brent & Maia Szalavitz, Lost Boy, Broadway Books, New York, 2009, 241 pp.  First person account of life and exile of Brent Jeffs, nephew of "prophet" Warren Jeffs of FLDS Church.

External links
Lost boys are the forgotten polygamy victims - Vancouver Sun article by Daphne Bramham
Boys Cast Out by Polygamists Find Help - New York Times article by Erik Eckholm, Published: September 9, 2007
 The Hope Organization (dozens of news articles 2004-2010)
 The Diversity Foundation https://archive.today/20130415203503/http://www.smilesfordiversity.org/cod.php

Child abandonment
Child welfare
People excommunicated by the Fundamentalist Church of Jesus Christ of Latter-Day Saints
Mormon fundamentalists
Mormonism-related controversies
Mormonism and polygamy
Christianity and children
Demographic economics
Men